() is an optical phenomenon in which a bright spot appears around the shadow of the viewer's head in the presence of dew. In photogrammetry and remote sensing, it is more commonly known as the hotspot. It is also occasionally known as Cellini's halo after the Italian artist and writer Benvenuto Cellini (15001571), who described the phenomenon in his memoirs in 1562.

Nearly spherical dew droplets act as lenses to focus the light onto the surface behind them. When this light scatters or reflects off that surface, the same lens re-focuses that light into the direction from which it came. This configuration is sometimes called a cat's eye retroreflector. Any retroreflective surface is brightest around the antisolar point.

Opposition surge by other particles than water and the glory in water vapour are similar effects caused by different mechanisms.

See also
 Aureole effect
 Brocken spectre, the magnified shadow of an observer cast upon the upper surfaces of clouds opposite the Sun
 Gegenschein, a faint spot of dust lit by sunlight focused by Earth's atmosphere, visible in the night sky toward the antisolar point
 Retroreflector
 Subparhelic circle
 Sylvanshine

References

External links

A site showing examples of a Heiligenschein
What causes heiligenschein

Atmospheric optical phenomena